"House Party at Boothy's" was the third single by Little Man Tate. After its first week of release, it reached 29 in the UK Singles chart.

The title song is about house parties the band used to go to at their friend, Boothy's house.

The inside sleeve of the vinyl features an Ordnance Survey map, with an arrow pointing directly to the house where these parties were held.

The back of the single features a phone number, which when called yielded a recorded message from Boothy, inviting you to a house party, which MTV attended.

The track appeared on the NME Presents the Essential Bands 2006 Album.

Track listings 
CD
 "House Party at Boothy's"
 "Teenager"

7" vinyl, #1
 "House Party at Boothy's"
 "Teenager"

7" vinyl, #2 (limited)
 "House Party at Boothy's" (Steve Lamacq Session)
 "Man I Hate Your Band" (Steve Lamacq Session)

References

2006 singles
Little Man Tate (band) songs
2006 songs
V2 Records singles